Aleppo Province  may refer to:
 Aleppo Governorate, Syria
 Aleppo Eyalet, Ottoman Empire
 Aleppo Vilayet, Ottoman Empire

Province name disambiguation pages